Berlinia is a genus of plants in the family Fabaceae.

Species accepted by the Plants of the World Online as of February 2021:

Fossil pollen attributable to the genus is known from the Eocene (Ypresian) of Africa.

Berlinia auriculata 
Berlinia bisulcata 
Berlinia bracteosa 
Berlinia brazzavillensis 
Berlinia bruneelii 
Berlinia cabrae 
Berlinia confusa 
Berlinia congolensis 
Berlinia coriacea 
Berlinia craibiana 
Berlinia giorgii 
Berlinia grandiflora 
Berlinia hollandii 
Berlinia immaculata 
Berlinia korupensis 
Berlinia lundensis 
Berlinia occidentalis 
Berlinia orientalis 
Berlinia phenacoa 
Berlinia rabiensis 
Berlinia razzifera 
Berlinia sapinii 
Berlinia tomentella 
Berlinia viridicans

References

External links

Detarioideae
Fabaceae genera
Taxa named by Joseph Dalton Hooker